Leighton Hope (born 4 November 1952) is a Canadian sprinter. He competed in the men's 4 × 400 metres relay at the 1976 Summer Olympics.

References

1952 births
Living people
Athletes (track and field) at the 1976 Summer Olympics
Canadian male sprinters
Olympic track and field athletes of Canada
Jamaican emigrants to Canada
Sportspeople from Kingston, Jamaica